Danny Sapani (born 15 November 1970) is a British actor who works in British, American, and Indian films. He is best known for appearing in Misfits, Doctor Who, Penny Dreadful, The Crown, Star Wars: The Last Jedi and Black Panther.

Early life
Sapani was born in London, one of six children of immigrant Ghanaian parents. He was raised in Hackney, and first pursued his interest in acting at the Weekend Arts College in Kentish Town. He trained at the Central School of Speech and Drama.

Career
Sapani appeared in Danny Boyle's film Trance. His stage credits include August Wilson's Joe Turner's Come and Gone and Radio Golf, Errol John's Caribbean classic Moon on a Rainbow Shawl and The National Theatre production of Euripides' Medea. He has also acted in the 2013 Indian action film, Singam II as drug lord Michael Kong (same codename as himself). 

In 2021 he played alongside Adrian Lester in the streamed version of Lolita Chakrabarti's Hymn from the Almeida theatre in London. Their performances were described as 'captivating, delicately picking out the nuances of two men who are simultaneously complete and broken'.

His TV roles include appearances on Misfits, Ultimate Force and Blackout, while his television guest appearances include Judge John Deed and the Doctor Who episode "A Good Man Goes to War." as Colonel Manton. For the first two seasons, Sapani played the role of Sembene in Showtime's Penny Dreadful.

On 19 August 2019 Deadline reported that Sapani would be joining the cast of the BBC America and AMC series Killing Eve.

Filmography

Film

Television

References

External links
 

English male film actors
1970 births
Living people
English male television actors
English people of Ghanaian descent
Male actors from London
Black British male actors
People from the London Borough of Hackney